The 2015 FIBA 3x3 World Tour is the 4th season of the FIBA 3x3 World Tour, the highest professional 3x3 basketball competition in the World. The tournament is organized by FIBA.

The final tournament of the 2015 FIBA 3x3 World Tour was held in Abu Dhabi, United Arab Emirates on 15–16 October 2015. The best two teams from each Masters tournament were qualified to participate in the World Tour finals with the champions qualifying for a berth at the 2015 FIBA 3x3 All Stars, to be held in Doha, Qatar on 11 December 2015.

Finals qualification
Six Masters Tournaments were held in six cities in six countries. 12 teams participate in the finals which is held in Abu Dhabi, UAE on October 15–16. Two best teams from each masters tournament qualified for the finals.

Group stage

Group A

Group B

Group C

Group D

Second round

Final standing

Awards 
Most Valuable Player:  Dušan Domović Bulut (Novi Sad Al-Wahda)

References

FIBA 3x3 World Tour seasons
World Tour